Abdus Salam (born 28 February 1942) is a Bangladesh Awami League politician, retired major general, and the former Member of Parliament of Mymensingh-9.

Career
Abdus Salam was elected to parliament from Mymensingh-9 as a Bangladesh Awami League candidate in 2008. His nomination was cancelled by the Bangladesh Election Commission for defaulting on a loan. He appealed the cancellation and was subsequently elected during the appeal process. In 2013, Bangladesh High Court cancelled his election following an appeal by an Awami League activists.

References

Awami League politicians
Living people
9th Jatiya Sangsad members
Bangladesh Army generals
7th Jatiya Sangsad members
1942 births